'Honeygold' is a cold-hardy cultivar of domesticated apple, which was developed to suit for the northern cold areas. It was developed by the Minnesota Agricultural Experiment Station's Horticultural Research Center of the University of Minnesota. They were crossing a Golden Delicious with a Haralson in order to obtain a Golden Delicious style fruit with the cold hardiness of the Haralson, a goal which was successfully achieved.

'Honeygold' produces pinkish white blossoms at each spring. Fruit size is medium to large round conical shape. Skin surface is smooth and golden-yellow to greenish with red-bronze blush. Flesh is yellowish-white with flavor very similar to Golden Delicious but is sweeter, crisper and more bland. Keeps very good approximately 3 months. Is best for use in fresh eating and salads, also recommended for baking, apple pies and apple sauce.

'Honeygold' is somewhat famous from being falsely labeled as one parent of the 'Honeycrisp'.

References

External links
Adam's Apples Blog
Missouri Botanical Gardens
YMKER Greenhouse

University of Minnesota
Minnesota University breeds